The Coupe de France 2001–02 was its 85th edition. It was won by FC Lorient.

The cup winner qualified for UEFA Cup.

Round of 16

Quarter-finals

Semi-finals

Final

Topscorer
Pauleta (4 goals)
Tony Vairelles (4 goals)

References

French federation
2001–02 Coupe de France at ScoreShelf.com

 
2001–02 domestic association football cups
2001-02